7808 Cookham Manor is a Great Western Railway 7800 'Manor' Class steam locomotive. It was built in 1938 at Swindon Works, withdrawn from service in December 1965 and purchased directly from British Railways for preservation by John Mynors, a member of the Great Western Society,  in 1965–66. 'Cookham Manor' was the only 'Manor' Class locomotive to have been bought directly from BR. Initially it was stored at Ashchurch, until moving to Didcot in August 1970.

It was said to be considered highly by the crews that operated it, and unusually for the class, the locomotive was fitted with a larger  water tender.

The locomotive initially saw considerable main line use soon after preservation, but is currently on static display awaiting a major overhaul at Didcot Railway Centre.

The locomotive cost £3,986 excluding the tender when built in 1938, and had travelled  by 28 December 1963.

Allocations

The allocations of 'Cookham Manor' during its service for the GWR and British Railways.

References

External links
 Cookham Manor homepage
 Great Western Archive

7808
7808
Railway locomotives introduced in 1938
Standard gauge steam locomotives of Great Britain